The Freedom Quilting Bee was a quilting cooperative based in Rehobeth, Alabama, that operated from 1966 until 2012. Originally begun by African American women as a way to generate income, some of the Bee's quilts were displayed in the Smithsonian Institution.

History 
The Freedom Quilting Bee was a quilting cooperative with members located throughout the Black Belt of Alabama. Black women created the cooperative in 1966 as a way to generate income for their families. The women began selling their quilts at the suggestion of Father Francis X. Walter, a priest who was returning to the area as part of the Selma Inter-religious Project. He received a seven hundred dollar grant and traveled through the Black Belt looking for quilts to present at an auction.

After the first auction in New York City, the quilts gained critical acclaim and popularity, prompting the craftswomen to organize an official quilting cooperative. The Freedom Quilting Bee, as an alternative economic organization, is part of a history of collective economic work of Black Americans. These alternative economics were used raise the socioeconomic status of poor Black communities. During the late 1960s and 1970s the cooperative changed its operations to increase profits through a more mass market model. New Yorker Stanley Selengut was hired as the industrial development consultant. Working for just travel expenses, he brought their quilts to New York City and helped the cooperative make deals with Bloomingdales and Sears.

On March 8, 1969, the Bee began construction on the Martin Luther King, Jr., Memorial Sewing Center, designed by architect Martin Stein gratis and funded by small philanthropic foundations and through an interest-free loan from the American Friends Service Committee, Atlanta. The 4500-square-foot building was constructed by the husbands of the quiltmakers and other nonprofessional workers because the project only had funds to pay one skilled builder. Finding a property to buy had been difficult, because Southern whites refused to sell to blacks. The sale of the land to the Bee's members had been so unlikely that they bought all they could, 17 acres, with plans to resell parcels to blacks, largely shut out of the real estate market.

In 1970, Reverend Xavier found a white Catholic nun, Sister Catherine Martin, to help with office duties such as typing, invoicing, and bookkeeping twice a week. Martin helped the Bee establish a system in which the women were paid for piecework they did on the Bee's big contracts. Some of the women had never had an opportunity to be paid for their labor; the Bee's payments enabled them to raise the standard of living for themselves and their families.

Membership in the Freedom Quilting Bee  dwindled in the 1990s and the community space they used was damaged by weather. In 2012, a year after the last original board member died, the Bee officially closed. Commonly confused with the Quilters of Gee's Bend, the Freedom Quilting Bee was a separate organization with a similar mission and overlapping membership.

Members 
Influential members of the Freedom Quilting Bee include Willie "Ma Willie" Abrams and her daughter, Estelle Witherspoon. Both women come from the town of Rehoboth, Alabama, a town ten miles north of Gee's Bend and a hub for the Bee. Abrams, a talented quilter, produced many of the quilts sold, and was instrumental to the Bee in its formative years. Witherspoon, an influential political leader in Rehoboth, worked as the head manager of the organization for over twenty years. Other important founding members were Minder Pettway Coleman, Aolar Carson Mosely (pronounced a-O-lur, Mattie Clark Ross, Mary Boykin Robinson, China Grove Myles, Lucy Marie Mingo, Nettie Pettway Young, and Polly Mooney Bennett. Mary Lee Bendolph of Gee's Bend also participated briefly.<ref>Joanne Cubbs, "The Life and Art of Mary Lee Bendolph," in Mary Lee Bendolph, Gee's Bend Quilts, and Beyond, edited by Paul Arnett and Eugene W. Metcalf Jr. With essays by Cubbs, Matt Arnett, and Dana Friis-Hansen, Atlanta, Tinwood Books, and Austin, Austin Museum of Art, 2006, 21.</ref>

 Critical acclaim 
After the first auction in New York City the Bee quilts were picked up by Vogue and Bloomingdale's. When the art world began to take notice of the quilts they ended up in an exhibition in the Smithsonian. A New York Times'' review called the quilts "some of the most miraculous works of modern art America has produced." The quilts have been compared to 20th century abstract styles which are much different than the common orderly American quilting styles.

Quilts 
The Bee quilts were stitched from scraps of cloth using patterns reflective of the history of Black quilting in the area. The craft was usually learned from a mother or grandmother. Some of the scraps of cloth even came from old denim clothes that were too old to continue wearing in the cotton fields.

References 

1966 establishments in Alabama
2012 disestablishments in Alabama